The Pennamite–Yankee Wars or Yankee–Pennamite Wars were a series of conflicts consisting of the First Pennamite War (1769–1770), the Second Pennamite War (1774), and the Third Pennamite War (1784), in which the Wyoming Valley along the North Branch of the Susquehanna River was disputed between settlers from Connecticut (Yankees) and Pennsylvania (Pennamites).

Grants to Connecticut and Penn

Claims on the Wyoming Valley were disputed from the start. The Dutch regarded the Susquehanna River as the border between New Netherland and the English colony of Virginia. King Charles II of Great Britain rejected all Dutch claims on North America and he granted the land to Connecticut in 1662, two years before his country's conquest of New Netherland and its subsequent conversion into the Province of New York. In 1681, Charles II also included the same land in the grant to William Penn.

The charter of each colony assigned the territory to the colony so that overlapping land claims existed. In the 17th century, fierce resistance by the Susquehannock rendered the debate academic, but by the mid-18th century, the double grant became problematic. Thomas Paine mentioned the conflict in his pro-independence pamphlet Common Sense as evidence that "Continental matters" could be sensibly regulated only by a Continental government.

Both colonies purchased the same land by treaties with the Indians. Connecticut sent settlers to the area in 1754, but the work of colonization was delayed for a time by the Seven Years' War. In 1768 the Iroquois Confederacy repudiated their sale to Connecticut's Susquehanna Company and sold the land to the Penns; however Yankee settlers from Connecticut founded the town of Wilkes-Barre in 1769. Armed bands of Pennsylvanian Pennamites tried to expel them without success from 1769 to 1770, starting the First Pennamite War. This was followed by the Second Pennamite War in 1775, and by the Third Pennamite War in 1784.

Connecticut's claim was confirmed by King George III in 1771. In 1773, more settlers from Connecticut erected a new town which they named Westmoreland. In December 1775, the Pennsylvanians refused to leave, and the militia of Northumberland County, Pennsylvania, forced them at gunpoint to leave.

Resolution
Conflicts continued between the two claimants at the end of the American Revolution, and the Continental Congress overturned the king's ruling in 1782 and upheld Pennsylvania's claim to the area. As such, it remains the only interstate dispute settled by Congress under the Articles of Confederation. But the state of Pennsylvania sought to force the Yankees from the land in 1784, which began the Third Pennamite War, with Connecticut and Vermont sending men to help the settlers. During the conflict, the Pennsylvania general John Armstrong, assisting the Pennsylvania representative Alexander Patterson, brought about a truce by promising impartial justice and protection, but as soon as the Yankees were defenseless he took them prisoner. This treatment swayed public sentiment in favor of the Yankees, and Patterson was withdrawn. Umbrage remained and disputes broke out until the Pennsylvania Legislature confirmed the various land titles in 1788. The controversy ended in 1799, with the Wyoming Valley becoming part of Pennsylvania and the Yankee settlers becoming Pennsylvanians with legal claims to their land.

See also
 On July 3, 1778, the infamous Battle of Wyoming occurred, which was an episodic event within the Pennamite–Yankee War period, but actually was part of the American Revolution.

References

Bibliography
 Ousterhout, Anne M. "Frontier Vengeance: Connecticut Yankees vs. Pennamites in the Wyoming Valley," Pennsylvania History, Summer 1995, Vol. 62 Issue 3, pp 330–363
 Smith, Story of Wyoming Valley, (Kingston, Pa., 1906)

Primary sources
The following printed resources are in the collection of the Connecticut State Library (CSL)
Boyd, J. P. The Susquehannah Company, 1753–1803. [CSL call number: F157 .W9 B69 1931]
Henry, William (ed.). Documents Relating to the Connecticut Settlement in the Wyoming Valley. Bowie, MD: Heritage Books, Inc., 1990 [CSL call number: F157 .W9 D63 1990 v1, 2].
Joyce, Mary Hinchcliffe. Pioneer Days in the Wyoming Valley. Philadelphia: 1928 [CSL call number: F157 .W9 J89].
Smith, William. An Examination of the Connecticut Claim to Lands in Pennsylvania: With an Appendix, Containing Extracts and Copies Taken from Original Papers. Philadelphia: Joseph Crukshank, 1774 [CSL call number: Wells Collection F157 .W9 S55].
Stark, S. Judson. The Wyoming Valley: Probate Records... Wilkes-Barre, PA: Wyoming Historical and Geological Society, 1923 [CSL call number: F157 .W9 S72].
Warfle, Richard Thomas. Connecticut's Western Colony; the Susquehannah Affair. (Connecticut Bicentennial Series, #32). Hartford, CT: American Revolutionary Bicentennial Commission of Connecticut, 1979 [CSL call number: Conn Doc Am35 cb num 32].
Wilkes-Barre, Pennsylvania. Wilkes-Barre (the "Diamond City"), Luzerne County, Pennsylvania. Wilkes-Barre, PA: The Committee on Souvenir and Program, 1906 [CSL call number: F159 .W6 W65 1906].

External links
Connecticut's "Susquehannah Settlers" 
 Story of the wars between Connecticut and Pennsylvania

American Revolutionary War
Military history of the Thirteen Colonies
Pre-statehood history of Connecticut
Pre-statehood history of Pennsylvania
History of Luzerne County, Pennsylvania
Internal territorial disputes of the United States
Internal wars of the United States